Insan Jaag Utha is a 1959 Hindi-language social drama film, produced and directed by Shakti Samanta, and written by Nabendu Ghosh and Vrajendra Gaur, based on a story by Saroj Mitra. The film stars Madhubala, Sunil Dutt, Nasir Hussain, Bipin Gupta and Madan Puri in lead roles. It has music by Sachin Dev Burman, with lyrics by Shailendra.

Plot
Gauri lives in a small village in India with her crippled ex-army-man and freedom fighter dad, Laxmandas, and a younger brother, Gulab, and makes a living working as a laborer. One day she notices a man lurking around their house, this man subsequently introduces himself as Ranjeet, who has just arrived from Bombay. Ranjeet and Gauri become friends after he treats a wound on Gauri's foot, and then both fall in love with each other. Ranjeet starts working for the Government which is in the process of building a dam, where Gauri also works. Ranjeet starts work as a laborer also, but is subsequently promoted as a crane operator. What Gauri and Laxmandas do not know is that Ranjeet is in this village for a reason - greed for the suitcase of gold that he himself had buried in Gauri's front-yard - the very same gold that he was caught smuggling five years ago and the very same gold that he had spent five years in prison for.

Cast
 Madhubala as Gauri
 Sunil Dutt as Ranjeet
 Nazir Hussain as Laxmandas
 Bipin Gupta as Minister
 Madan Puri as Mohan Singh
 Minoo Mumtaz as Muniya
 Sundar as Sukham
 Mauji Singh in the song (Baharon Se Nazaron Ke Dekho)
 Praveen Paul as Hotel Owner
 Nishi as Hansa / Riny
 Keshav Rana as Robert
 Shyam Kumar as Chander
 Kundan as Bahadur

Production 

Early in his career, Samanta had directed only crime thrillers including Inspector (1956) and Howrah Bridge (1958). A few days after the success of Howrah Bridge (1958), which was directed and also produced by him, he began working on Insan Jaag Utha. Insan Jaag Utha was a film with social and patriotic themes, and this was an attempt by Samanta to shift to making social films. A large part of the film was shot on location at the Nagarjuna Saagar Dam, and the whole crew stayed in several guest rooms situated near the dam.

Soundtrack 

The soundtrack of the film was composed by S. D. Burman, with lyrics by Shailendra. It is noted for the duet Jaanu Jaanu Ri sung by Asha Bhosle and Geeta Dutt, which was shot on location at the under-construction Nagarjuna Sagar Dam.

Reception

Critical reception 
Shoma A. Chatterjee of Upperstall found the film's storyline to be "powerful" and its songs to be "beautiful". Filmfare had mentioned Madhubala's performance as Gauri in the film among her best performances.

Box office 
Insan Jaag Utha was a hit with audience and eventually emerged as the thirteenth highest-grossing film of 1959, taking 0.52 crore at the box office. However, since the film was made on a big budget, its earning brought Samanta only a little profit. In an interview he gave several years after the film's release, he recalled Insan Jaag Utha as a "mediocre success".

Discouraged by the little box-office returns of Insan Jaag Utha, Samanta shifted back to make entertainment-oriented, crime films for another decade, beginning with the highly successful Jaali Note (1960), before attempting the socially relevant film genre with films like Aradhana (1969), Kati Patang (1971) and Amar Prem (1971).

References

External links
 
 , Rajshri Films Official channel
 

Indian drama films
1959 films
Films directed by Shakti Samanta
Films scored by S. D. Burman
Indian black-and-white films
1959 drama films
1950s Hindi-language films
Hindi-language drama films